Wright Haskell Langham (21 May 1911 – 19 May 1972) was an internationally renowned expert in the fields of plutonium exposure, aerospace and aviation medicine, Eniwetok nuclear tests, the Palomares and Greenland nuclear accidents. Sometimes Langham was referred to as Mr. Plutonium.

Life and times

Wright Haskell Langham was born in Winnsboro, Texas on 21 May 1911. Langham attended Texhoma High School in Texhoma, Oklahoma and graduated in 1930 and earned a BS in Chemistry from Oklahoma Panhandle State College in 1934. Langham was awarded a MS in Chemistry from Oklahoma A & M College in 1935. Next he attended Iowa State University and pursued studies in organic chemistry. Langham completed the Ph.D. in Biochemistry from the University of Colorado in 1943.

Radiation Tests on Human Subjects

Dr. Langham wrote and oversaw experiments intended to gauge the effects of exposure to radioactive elements on humans. The experiments involved injecting subjects with radioactive isotopes of polonium, plutonium or uranium without the informed consent of the subject. Dr. Langham suggested in public papers after the experiments that the patients had been terminally ill.

Death

On 19 May 1972, Langham died in a plane crash. A twin-engine aircraft chartered by the Los Alamos Scientific Laboratories crashed on takeoff from Albuquerque International Airport, killing all nine persons aboard, including Langham, a leading biomedical scientist. Witnesses said the Beechcraft Queen Air, chartered to shuttle Los Alamos personnel between Albuquerque and Los Alamos, apparently lost power in one engine and nosedived into an open field south of the control tower. Authorities reported that all 8 passengers and the pilot were killed when the plane crashed.

The victims Included Dr. Langham, who was then associate division leader for biomedical research at Los Alamos. He had been working at the laboratory since 1944, and was a leading plutonium scientist. The other casualties were technicians or staff members, and were Eugene Teatum, 37; Donald A. Larson, 46; Bruce A. Bean, 28; Johnnie E. Gallegos, 41; Richard O. Neithammer, 39; William Paul Frye, 40; and John Allen Gill, 43. The pilot was Richard T. Zittel of Ross Aviation. All the victims were from Los Alamos, except for Gill who was from Arroyo Seco, New Mexico.

The plane was on a routine flight from Albuquerque to Los Alamos, lost an engine during takeoff, and crashed into the runway. The crash occurred shortly after midday at 1:37 p.m. Aviation officials remarked that high winds (up to 31 knots) might have contributed to the crash.

Career Highlights
Oklahoma Panhandle A & M College, Agricultural Experiment Station, Research Chemist, 1935-1937, 1939-1941
University of Chicago, Metallurgical Laboratory, Research Chemist, 1943-1944
Los Alamos Scientific Laboratory, Biomedical Research Division, Chemist, Group Leader, Associate Division Leader, 1944-1972
University of California at Los Angeles, Associate Professor, 1944-1972

Professional Service
Tripartite Permissible Doses Conference, 1949
University of Utah, Radiobiology Project, Founding Fathers Group
NAS-NRC, Committee on Pathologic Effects of Atomic Radiation, Subcommittee on Toxicity of Internal Emitters, 1956-1960
National Committee on Radiation Protection and Measurements, Relative Biological Effectiveness, Sub-Committee M-4, Chairman, 1957-1960
AEC and DOD, Nevada Test Site, Pacific atolls, Rongelap, 1954-1955
U.S. Air Force and U.S. State Department, Special Assignment: Palomares, Spain, 1966; Thule, Greenland, 1968
U.S. Congress, Joint Committee on Atomic Energy, Testimonies at Hearings
AEC, Nevada Applied Ecology Group, Ad Hoc Committee on Plutonium, Chairman, 1970-1972
NAS-NRC, Space Science Board, Life Sciences Committee, Space Radiobiology Panel, Chairman, 1964-1966
NAS-NRC, Space Science Board, Committee on Space Medicine, Radiobiology Advisory Panel, Chairman, 1967-1971

Health Physics Society
Board of Directors, Member, 1958-1961, 1968-1970
President-Elect, 1967-1968
President, Chairman of Board, 1968-1969
Past-President, Awards Committee Chairman, 1969-1970

Achievements and Honors

Eniwetok Atoll nuclear tests, 1951
PUQFUA, Plutonium Body Burden (Q) from Urine Analysis – software program
Palomares B-52 crash in Spain, 1966.
Thule Air Base B-52 crash, 1968
Working Group on Human Factors and Training of the Special Committee on Space Technology, NASA, 1958
Special Committee on Life Sciences, NASA, 1958-1960
Committee on Space Medicine, NASA, Chairman
Atomic Energy Commission
Department of Defense, Distinguished Service Award, 1967
Panhandle State College, Alumni Ambassadors Hall of Fame, 1973

References

1911 births
1972 deaths
People from Winnsboro, Texas
Oklahoma Panhandle State University alumni
Oklahoma State University alumni
Iowa State University alumni
20th-century American biochemists
University of Colorado alumni
Los Alamos National Laboratory personnel
NASA people
Nuclear Regulatory Commission
United States Air Force civilians
Victims of aviation accidents or incidents in the United States